Tombokoirey may refer to a pair of Nigerien municipalities of Dosso Region:

Tombokoirey I
Tombokoirey II